The 1997 European Challenge Cup Final was the final match of the 1996–97 European Challenge Cup, the inaugural season of Europe's second tier club rugby union competition. The match was played on 26 January 1997 at Stade de la Méditerranée in Béziers.

The match was contested by Bourgoin and Castres Olympique, who are both from France. Bourgoin won the match 18–9; with match conceding no tries by either team. The only points came from the goal kickers, Alexandre Péclier and Patrice Favre for Bourgoin and Cyril Savy and Sebastien Paillat for Castres.

Match details

See also
1996–97 European Challenge Cup

References

Final
1997
1996–97 in French rugby union
Castres Olympique
CS Bourgoin-Jallieu matches